The 2022 WTA German Open (also known as the bett1open for sponsorship purposes) was a professional tennis tournament played on outdoor grass courts at the Rot-Weiss Tennis Club in Berlin, Germany from 13 June to 19 June 2022. It was the 95th edition of the event on the 2022 WTA Tour, the second year it has been organized on grass, and was classified as a WTA 500 tournament.

Champions

Singles

  Ons Jabeur def.  Belinda Bencic, 6–3, 2–1, ret.

This was Jabeur's third WTA singles title, and second of the year.

Doubles

  Storm Sanders /  Kateřina Siniaková def.  Alizé Cornet /  Jil Teichmann 6–4, 6–3

Point distribution

Singles main-draw entrants

Seeds

 Rankings are as of 6 June 2022.

Other entrants
The following players received wildcards into the singles main draw:
  Anna Kalinskaya
  Jule Niemeier

The following players received entry using a protected ranking into the singles main draw:
  Bianca Andreescu
  Karolína Muchová

The following players received entry from the qualifying draw:
  Anastasia Gasanova
  Léolia Jeanjean 
  Tamara Korpatsch 
  Alycia Parks
  Daria Saville
  Wang Xinyu

Withdrawals
Before the tournament
  Victoria Azarenka → replaced by  Kaia Kanepi
  Paula Badosa → replaced by  Aliaksandra Sasnovich
  Danielle Collins → replaced by  Liudmila Samsonova
  Leylah Fernandez → replaced by  Ekaterina Alexandrova
  Sofia Kenin → replaced by  Veronika Kudermetova
  Madison Keys → replaced by  Kateřina Siniaková
  Anett Kontaveit → replaced by  Andrea Petkovic
  Jessica Pegula → replaced by  Anhelina Kalinina
  Elena Rybakina → replaced by  Ann Li
  Iga Świątek → replaced by  Alizé Cornet

Doubles main-draw entrants

Seeds

1 Rankings are as of 6 June 2022.

Other entrants
The following pairs received wildcards into the doubles main draw:
  Bianca Andreescu /  Sabine Lisicki
  Jule Niemeier /  Andrea Petkovic

The following pair received entry as alternates:
  Han Xinyun /  Alexandra Panova

Withdrawals
Before the tournament
  Natela Dzalamidze /  Kamilla Rakhimova → replaced by  Kaitlyn Christian /  Lidziya Marozava
  Desirae Krawczyk /  Demi Schuurs → replaced by  Anna Kalinskaya /   Desirae Krawczyk
  Veronika Kudermetova /  Aryna Sabalenka → replaced by  Han Xinyun /  Alexandra Panova

References

External links
Official website
WTA website

2022 German Open
2022 WTA Tour
2022 in German tennis
June 2022 sports events in Germany